Aurich – Emden is an electoral constituency (German: Wahlkreis) represented in the Bundestag. It elects one member via first-past-the-post voting. Under the current constituency numbering system, it is designated as constituency 24. It is located in northwestern Lower Saxony, comprising the city of Emden and the district of Aurich.

Aurich – Emden was created for the inaugural 1949 federal election. It was abolished in 1965 and re-established in the 1980 federal election. Since 2013, it has been represented by Johann Saathoff of the Social Democratic Party (SPD).

Geography
Aurich – Emden is located in northwestern Lower Saxony. As of the 2021 federal election, it comprises the independent city of Emden and the district of Aurich.

History
Aurich – Emden was created in 1949. In the 1949 election, it was Lower Saxony constituency 1. From 1953 to 1965, it was constituency number 23. Originally, it comprised the city of Emden and the districts of Aurich and Norden, the latter of which was incorporated into the former in 1977.

Aurich – Emden was abolished in the 1965 election. The city of Emden and the Norden district became part of the Emden – Leer constituency, while the Aurich district became part of the Wilhelmshaven constituency.

Aurich – Emden was re-established in the 1980 election. Thereafter, it was constituency 19. In the 1998 election, it became constituency 25; it has been constituency 24 since the 2013 election. Its borders have not changed since its re-establishment.

Members
The constituency has been held continuously by the Social Democratic Party (SPD) throughout both its incarnations. It is a traditional stronghold of the SPD, often one of the party's safest constituencies. Its first representative was Georg Peters, who served from 1949 until the constituency's abolition in 1965. He was succeeded by Jann-Peter Janssen, who served until 2005; he was in turn succeeded by Garrelt Duin. Johann Saathoff was elected in 2013, and re-elected in 2017 and 2021.

Election results

2021 election

2017 election

2013 election

2009 election

References

Hanover
1949 establishments in West Germany
Constituencies established in 1949